Samuel Mullen (27 November 1828 – 29 May 1890) was an Irish-born bookseller, active in Australia.

Mullen was born in  Dublin, Ireland, the son of George Mullen, a bookseller, and his wife Eliza, née Orson. Mullen was educated at Nuttgrove College and later at Trinity College, Dublin. At age 16, Mullen was indentured to an apothecary, but did not like the work.

In 1844 Mullen was apprenticed to William Curry and Company Booksellers and some time afterwards went to England and joined the firm of Parker and Company.

Mullen went to the Western District to visit some friends and stayed for six months on a station. He then joined George Robertson as his first assistant in Melbourne and remained with him until 1857.

Mullen went to London to act as buyer for Robertson, but the arrangement fell through and Mullen decided to start for himself in Melbourne. He returned with a brother, William Lowell Mullen, and a good stock of books, and began business at 35 Collins Street East in 1859.

Mullen started a high-class library based on Mudie's of London which became a leading lending library in Melbourne. The book-shop was also very successful, a large stock was carried, and it was a centre of intellectual life in the city for a time.

Mullen retired from business in 1889 and died while on a visit to London on 29 May 1890. Mullen was married twice, firstly to Eliza Moss (died 15 October 1868) and secondly to Wilhelmina Wild on 17 September 1870. Mullen was survived by children from both marriages.

Mullen's business continued on in Collins Street until 1922, when it merged with George Robertson and Company under the name of Robertson and Mullens Ltd.

References

1828 births
1890 deaths
Australian publishers (people)
Businesspeople from Dublin (city)
Businesspeople from Melbourne
19th-century Australian businesspeople
Australian booksellers